Doliskana is a medieval Georgian Orthodox monastery in the Medieval Georgian kingdom of Klarjeti (modern-day Artvin Province of Turkey). It was used as a mosque, now abandoned. Its construction was finished in the mid 10th century, during the rule of Sumbat I of Iberia. It is located high above the right bank of the Imerkhevi River.

The inscriptions

On the exterior walls of the church are several short inscriptions in Georgian Asomtavruli script. One mentions the prince and titular king Sumbat I of Iberia. The inscriptions have been dated to the first half of the 10th century.

References

Bibliography

Marr, Nicholas, The Diary of travel in Shavsheti and Klarjeti, St. Petersburg, 1911
Djobadze, Wachtang, Early medieval Georgian monasteries in historical Tao, Klarjeti and Shavsheti, 2007
Shoshiashvili, N. Lapidary Inscriptions, I, Tbilisi, 1980

External links 

 Virtualtao-klarjeti.com - Doliskana.

Buildings and structures completed in the 10th century
Georgian churches in Turkey
Christian monasteries established in the 10th century